Bradley John McIntosh (born 8 August 1981), also known as City Boy, is a British singer, rapper, record producer and actor. He was a member of the pop group S Club 7 where he enjoyed five years of hit singles, arena tours and awards. Since 2008, he has been a member of spin-off group S Club Allstars (previously "S Club 3").

Early life 
Born in south London, McIntosh attended Greenshaw High School. He was born to Jamaican musical parents (Lorraine and Steve McIntosh, both achieved success with The Cool Notes).

Career

1999–2003: S Club 7 

The group rose to fame by starring in their own BBC television series, Miami 7, in 1999. Over the five years they were together, S Club 7 had four UK No.1 singles, one UK No.1 album, a string of hits throughout Europe, including a top-ten single in the United States, Asia, Latin America, and Africa. They recorded a total of four studio albums, released eleven singles and went on to sell over fourteen million albums worldwide. Their first album, S Club, had a strong 1990s pop sound, similar to many artists of their time. Through the course of their career, their musical approach changed to a more dance and R&B sound, which is heard mostly in their final album, Seeing Double. S Club 7 won two Brit Awards – in 2000 for British breakthrough act and in 2002 for best British single. In 2001, the group earned the Record of the Year award. Group member Paul Cattermole departed from the group in 2002, and the group changed its name from S Club 7 to simply S Club. On 21 April 2003, during a live on-stage performance, S Club announced that they were to disband.

2004–2007: Upper Street 
Between 2004 and 2006 McIntosh tried to sign with some labels as solo artist, but failed. In 2006, he starred in an MTV reality show called Totally Boyband. Other people starring were members of disbanded groups. He became part of a boyband, Upper Street, made up of ex-members of 911, Steps, Another Level and New Kids on the Block. They released the single "The One" on 23 October 2006, but it was not a commercial success, reaching #35 on the UK Singles Chart and the band had split up after confrontation with their record company. Also in 2006, McIntosh was a competitor in Sport Relief, boxing against Jack Osbourne.

2008–present: Solo career and S Club Allstars 
In 2008, McIntosh and S Club 7 members Jo O'Meara and Paul Cattermole formed the S Club Allstars (previously "S Club 3") and performed in various nightclubs and universities in the United Kingdom and Australia. McIntosh released his debut solo single "No Regrets (Who We Are)" in 2010 as City Boy. He also uploaded several songs to his SoundCloud account, but no new single was officially released. In 2014, S Club 7 announced their plans for an arena reunion tour, promptly entitled Bring It All Back 2015, which toured the UK in May 2015.

After the full group reunion, McIntosh, O'Meara and Tina Barrett – replacing Cattermole – continued as "S Club 3". When O'Meara left in 2020, she was replaced the following year by S Club 8 original member Stacey Franks, and the group was renamed "S Club Allstars".

Discography

Singles 
As main artist

As featured artist

Production work

Filmography

References 

1981 births
English male actors
English male singers
English people of Jamaican descent
English pop singers
Living people
People from Lambeth
S Club 7 members
Upper Street (group) members